Dharamkot is a city and a municipal council in the Moga district in the state of Punjab, India.

Demographics
 India census, Dharamkot had a population of 15,399. Males constitute 33% of the population and females 67%. Dharamkot has an average literacy rate of 62%, higher than the national average of 59.5%; male literacy is 70%, and female literacy is 59%. In Dharamkot, 94% of the population is under 66 years of age.

References

External links 

 DISTRICT CENSUS HANDBOOK MOGA 2011 - VILLAGE AND TOWN WISE PRIMARY CENSUS ABSTRACT (PCA)

Cities and towns in Moga district